The AEG G.III was a German biplane bomber aircraft of World War I developed from the G.II. Like its predecessor, it was only built in small numbers and saw limited operational use, mainly far from the main fronts of the war.

Operators

Luftstreitkräfte

Specifications (AEG G.III)

See also

References

 Taylor, John W. R., and Jean Alexander. "Combat Aircraft of the World" New York: G.P. Putnam's Sons, 1969 Library of Congress Catalog Card Number 68-25459 (Pg.134-135)

Further reading

 Kroschel, Günter; Stützer, Helmut: Die deutschen Militärflugzeuge 1910-18, Wilhelmshaven 1977
 Munson, Kenneth: Bomber 1914–19, Zürich 1968, Nr. 20
 Nowarra, Heinz: Die Entwicklung der Flugzeuge 1914-18, München 1959
 Sharpe, Michael: Doppeldecker, Dreifachdecker & Wasserflugzeuge, Gondrom, Bindlach 2001, 

G.III
1910s German bomber aircraft
Aircraft first flown in 1915